General Lennox may refer to:

Bernard Gordon Lennox (1932–2017), British Army major-general
Charles Lennox, 2nd Duke of Richmond (1701–1750), British Army lieutenant-general
Charles Lennox, 3rd Duke of Richmond (1735–1806), British Army general
Charles Lennox, 4th Duke of Richmond (1764–1819), British Army general
Lord George Lennox (1737–1805), British Army general
Wilbraham Lennox (1830–1897), British Army lieutenant general
William J. Lennox Jr. (born 1949), U.S. Army lieutenant general